Harold Russell "Hal" Jackson (August 1, 1918 — January 30, 1997) was a Canadian ice hockey defenceman who played 219 games in the National Hockey League with Chicago Black Hawks and Detroit Red Wings between 1936 and 1947. He won the Stanley Cup with Chicago in 1938, and Detroit in 1943. He was born in Cedar Springs, Ontario.

Career statistics

Regular season and playoffs

External links
 

1918 births
1997 deaths
Buffalo Bisons (AHL) players
Canadian expatriate ice hockey players in the United States
Canadian ice hockey defencemen
Chicago Blackhawks players
Cleveland Barons (1937–1973) players
Detroit Red Wings players
Ice hockey people from Ontario
Indianapolis Capitals players
Providence Reds players
Stanley Cup champions
Sportspeople from Chatham-Kent
Toronto St. Michael's Majors players